Polish–Ottoman War (1683–1699) or the War of the Holy League refers to the Polish side of the conflict otherwise known as the Great Turkish War. The conflict begun with a great Polish victory at the Battle of Vienna in 1683, and ended with the Treaty of Karlowitz, restoring to the Polish–Lithuanian Commonwealth lands lost in the previous Polish-Ottoman War (the Polish–Ottoman War (1672–76)). It was the last conflict between the Polish–Lithuanian Commonwealth and the Ottoman Empire, and despite the Polish victory, it marked the decline of power of not only the Ottoman Empire, but also of the Commonwealth, which would never again interfere in affairs outside of its declining borders.

War
After a few years of peace, the Ottoman Empire attacked the Habsburg Empire again. The Ottomans almost captured Vienna, but king of Poland John III Sobieski led a Christian alliance that defeated them in the Battle of Vienna which shook the Ottoman Empire's hegemony in south-eastern Europe.

A new Holy League was initiated by Pope Innocent XI and encompassed the Holy Roman Empire (headed by Habsburg Austria), the Venetian Republic and Poland in 1684, joined by Tsarist Russia in 1686. Ottomans suffered two decisive defeats against the Holy Roman Empire: the second Battle of Mohács in 1687 and a decade later, in 1697, the battle of Zenta.

On the smaller Polish front, after the battles of 1683 (Vienna and Parkany), Sobieski, after his proposal for the League to start a major coordinated offensive, undertook a rather unsuccessful offensive in Moldavia in 1686, with the Ottomans refusing a major engagement and harassing the army. For the next four years Poland would blockade the key fortress at Kamenets, and Ottoman Tatars would raid the borderlands. In 1691, Sobieski undertook another expedition to Moldavia, with slightly better results, but still with no decisive victories.

The last battle of the campaign was the battle of Podhajce in 1698, where Polish hetman Feliks Kazimierz Potocki defeated the Ottoman incursion into the Commonwealth. The League won the war in 1699 and forced the Ottoman Empire to sign the Treaty of Karlowitz. The Ottomans lost much of their European possessions, with Podolia (including Kamenets) returned to Poland with imposition of Austria.

Battles
Please note, these battles represent the Polish-Ottoman front only, and don't include battles of the Great Turkish War that occurred without significant participation of the Polish troops.
 Battle of Vienna (12 September 1683)
 Battle of Párkány (7–9 October 1683)
 Battle of Reni (30 December-4 January 1684)
 Battle of Studenitsa
 Battle of Yazlovets (1684)
 Battle of Boiany (1685)
 Siege of Kamenets (Kamianets-Podilskyi) (1687)
 Battle of Novoselka (1688)
 Battle of Suceava (1691)
 Battle of Târgu Neamţ (1691)
 Battle of Hodów (June 1694)
 Battle of Ustechko (6 October 1694)
 Battle of Lwów (Lviv) (1695)
 Battle of Podhajce (8–9 September 1698)

Notes

References

External links

  
 Wojny polsko-tureckie, WIEM Encyklopedia 
 Wojny polsko-tureckie w drugiej połowie XVII wieku  

17th-century conflicts
Polish–Ottoman wars
1680s in the Polish–Lithuanian Commonwealth
1690s in the Polish–Lithuanian Commonwealth
1680s in the Ottoman Empire
1690s in the Ottoman Empire
Military history of Ukraine
Great Turkish War